Donald Higgins (1943–1989) was a Canadian academic specialising in Canadian local and urban politics. He was a professor at Saint Mary's University from 1973 until his death in 1989. He co-founded the Gorsebrook Research Institute.  His 1977 book Urban Canada, Its Government and Politics has been described as "a breakthrough for its appreciation of the politics of decision-making at city hall".

Life
He lived in Halifax, Nova Scotia.

Bibliography
Urban Canada, Its Government and Politics (1977)
Local and Urban Politics in Canada (1986)
"The Processes of Reorganizing Local Government in Canada", Canadian Journal of Political Science, Vol. 19, No. 2 (Jun., 1986), pp. 219–242

References

1943 births
1989 deaths
Academic staff of the Saint Mary's University (Halifax)
Canadian male non-fiction writers
Writers from Halifax, Nova Scotia
Canadian political scientists
20th-century political scientists